NCBA may refer to:

 National College of Business and Arts
 National Club Baseball Association
 National Cattlemen's Beef Association
 National Collegiate Boxing Association
 National Cooperative Business Association
 National Community Boats Association
 North Carolina Bar Association
 Northern California Band Association
 Northern California Baseball Association